Cage the Elephant is an American rock band formed in 2006 in Bowling Green, Kentucky. They moved to England, U.K. and settled in London in 2008, shortly before their self-titled first album was released. The band currently consists of Matt Shultz (vocals), his older brother Brad Shultz (rhythm guitar), Nick Bockrath (lead guitar), Matthan Minster (guitar, keyboards), Daniel Tichenor (bass), and Jared Champion (drums). The band's first album was released to much success, spawning several successful radio singles and gaining the band a large following in both the United States and the United Kingdom. It was influenced by classic rock, '90s alternative, blues, punk rock and funk music. Lincoln Parish served as the band's lead guitarist from their formation in 2006 until 2013, when he left on good terms to pursue a career in producing.

The band's second album, Thank You, Happy Birthday, was released in 2011 and was heavily influenced by punk rock as well as bands such as Pixies and Nirvana. The band's third album, Melophobia, was released in 2013 as the band's concerted effort to find its own distinct musical identity. The band's fourth album, Tell Me I'm Pretty, was produced by Dan Auerbach and released in 2015. The band released a live album, Unpeeled, in 2017. Their fifth studio album, Social Cues, was released in 2019. They won the Grammy Award for Best Rock Album twice, in 2017 for Tell Me I'm Pretty and in 2020 for Social Cues.

History

Previous careers
Before he was a band member for Cage the Elephant, Matt Shultz worked in construction as a plumber.  In an interview with the "Rock It Out!" blog for Consequence of Sound, he said he felt like if he did not quit that job, he would be stuck there for the rest of his life. He left to work at a sandwich bar with his brother, Brad Shultz, who had previously worked in telemarketing. Daniel Tichenor held a job at Lowe's and Jared Champion worked in a pet store.

Nick Bockrath is part of the band Nicos Gun and previously played bass with Morning Teleportation. Cage got to know him through their friendship with that band. Matthan Minster formed a band called YOURS in 2010.

Formation and name
Members of Cage the Elephant had previously been involved in the band Perfect Confusion when they were in high school and released a self-titled LP in 2005. Matt Shultz was also in an experimental punk band in middle school called Left Nostril.

The band's name, according to lead singer Matt Shultz, came from an incident in 2006 when a mentally disturbed man approached the band after a show.  He hugged Shultz and kept repeating the sentence "You have to cage the elephant" over and over again.

Early years and Cage the Elephant (2007–2010)

The band signed with Relentless Records after showcasing at the 2007 South by Southwest music festival. Their first tour was as a support act for Queens of the Stone Age in Canada. They then moved to London, England, to the Leyton area on the outskirts of the city. At the time, Lincoln Parish was only 16 years old, so in order to be able to move, his parents had to sign over parental guardianship to the band. In 2008, they appeared on the British show Later... with Jools Holland with Coldplay, Sia, Glen Campbell, John Mellencamp, and Amy LaVere. They released their eponymous debut album, Cage the Elephant, on June 23, 2008, in the United Kingdom and April 21, 2009, in the United States, Japan, Australia, and Canada, to mostly favorable reviews. Their single "Ain't No Rest for the Wicked" reached number 32 on the UK Singles Chart and was featured in the Gearbox Software video game Borderlands, as well as in the 2010 movie The Bounty Hunter. It was also featured as ITunes' free single of the week for the week of April 12, 2009.

Cage the Elephant appeared as a support act on tour with The Pigeon Detectives in early 2008, and for Silversun Pickups and Manchester Orchestra in 2009. They appeared on Everybody Loves Lil' Chris in October 2008. The group made a national TV appearance on the Late Show with David Letterman, performing "Ain't No Rest for the Wicked" in July 2009. In August 2009, Cage the Elephant played for the first time at Lollapalooza in Chicago, as well as San Francisco's Outside Lands Music and Arts Festival on August 30, 2009. Prior to their return to Lollapalooza, the band also performed twice at Bonnaroo, once in June 2007 and in 2009. They released the single "Back Against the Wall" which was later included in a Wii game, called We Cheer, We Cheer 2.

Thank You, Happy Birthday (2011–12)
The band's second album, Thank You, Happy Birthday, was released in January 2011. The album sold 39,000 copies during its first week in the U.S., debuting at Number 2 on the Billboard 200, losing to the band Cake's Showroom of Compassion. The album received positive reception from most critics.

Throughout the year, Cage the Elephant supported the album by playing live. The group landed multiple late night shows, such as the Late Show with David Letterman and The Tonight Show with Jay Leno. Cage the Elephant also landed the bill for music festivals such as Coachella and the Glastonbury Festival. On August 6, 2011, Cage the Elephant performed at the Kansas Speedway for the first annual Kanrocksas music festival. In the later half of the year, the band supported the Foo Fighters, who were on tour supporting their new album Wasting Light. In October, drummer Jared Champion's appendix suddenly burst, requiring immediate medical attention. Dave Grohl, the Foo Fighters' frontman and former drummer of Nirvana, temporarily filled in for Champion while he was recuperating.

The band's hit song "Shake Me Down" was nominated for a MTV Video Music Award for Best Rock Video in September 2011.

The group's audience expanded widely throughout 2011. Although they were formed in the 2000s, the band earned the top spot in Rolling Stones "Reader's Poll: The Best New Artist of 2011". The band Sleeper Agent, another Bowling Green music group and close friends with Cage the Elephant, came in second place. The magazine also named Thank You, Happy Birthday as the 15th best album of the year. That year, Cage the Elephant and Manchester Orchestra embarked on a co-headlining tour with Sleeper Agent as the opening band.

In January 2012, the band released the album Live from The Vic in Chicago, recorded during their 2011 tour, and also toured with the Big Day Out music festival.

Melophobia (2013–15)

Cage the Elephant regrouped in the studio to record their third album Melophobia (meaning "fear of music"). The album's lead single "Come a Little Closer" was teased via their YouTube channel on August 1, 2013, and premiered in full on August 8, 2013. It was released on iTunes for purchase on August 13. In an interview with iHeartRadio during Lollapalooza 2013, Matt Shultz revealed the title of the upcoming album. Melophobia was released on October 8, 2013, to largely positive reviews. Shultz mentions in an interview with Billboard that Melophobia is not a fear of music, rather, "It's a fear of creating music under false pretenses, catering to cool, or writing to project some sort of image that's based upon social standards...[It's] trying to sound artistic, poetic or intellectual, rather than just trying to communicate an honest thought or feeling or story." "Take It or Leave It" and "Cigarette Daydreams" were released on March 24, 2014 and August 26, 2014, respectively. The band toured with Muse as an opening act in the fall of 2013. 
On August 24, 2013, the band performed Melophobia in its entirety live at Soundcheck Nashville in front of an intimate audience of friends and family. The band also performed the songs "Spiderhead" and "Come A Little Closer" live on Los Angeles radio station KROQ. Lincoln Parish left the band early in December 2013 to focus on his production company, TalkBoxRodeo. In an interview, Parish said that he "wanted to be a producer before anything else. And then [Cage the Elephant] obviously took off and did more than what any of us could have expected." Guitarist Nick Bockrath filled in as lead guitarist on Jimmy Kimmel Live! on December 9 and, on subsequent shows. The Melophobia tour continued into 2014, including a stop at the Lollapalooza music festival on August 3. The band also toured with The Black Keys on their Turn Blue tour, and then with Foals on their 2014 UK and US tours.

In August 2013, Brad Shultz and his wife Lindsay had a child named Etta Grace, and on November 12, 2014, Jared Champion and his partner Alicia had a child named Rosalyn. Kyle Davis filled in for Champion during the December 2014 tour, while he spent time with his family.

Tell Me I'm Pretty (2015–17)
Cage the Elephant released their fourth album, Tell Me I'm Pretty, on December 18, 2015, with Dan Auerbach, a member of The Black Keys, as the producer. 
The band said they "just wanted to experiment with sounds. While you start experimenting with sound and you get out there a little bit, away from the norm, I think people will see that as psychedelic." This project reached farther than their usual work. The album's first single, "Mess Around", was first performed by the band on October 29, 2015. The band posted on Twitter stating that the song was inspired by the band Outkast and The Black Keys. The band then released their second single from the album, "Trouble." To promote the album, "Too Late To Say Goodbye" was put out to the public before the band released the full album.

The woman pictured on the cover of the album is model Rachel Sykes. In an interview, lead singer Matt Shultz said "When I looked at her, she was immediately beautiful to the eye but also there was some sense that she'd lived some real life in a way that I could relate to..." He then continued to say that she looked as if she had been "touched" and he was delighted to see how she acted in real life, when she was not being photographed or on camera. The album earned the band's first Grammy Award.

Social Cues (2018–present)
On November 26, 2018, the band announced on Twitter that their new album was "Done. Mixed. Mastered." On January 7, 2019, they released a sample of a song titled "Ready to Let Go" on their Instagram story. On January 31, the band officially released "Ready to Let Go", the first single off their new album.

On February 11, 2019, Cage the Elephant announced a summer 2019 co-headlining tour with Beck, who is featured on the Social Cues track "Night Running." It was also featured in the soundtrack to the PlayStation 4 game MLB The Show 19. The album Social Cues was released on April 19, 2019, via RCA Records.  A Matt Shultz directed music video for "Ready to Let Go" was released on January 31 as well. On September 23, Cage the Elephant announced tour dates in early 2020 in the UK and Europe. Supporting acts are Post Animal for the UK leg and SWMRS for the remainder of the European tour. On October 24, Cage the Elephant released a music video for the song "Social Cues" from their album Social Cues. It was shot at Adult Swims FishCenter Live in Atlanta, Georgia with additional direction from Matt Shultz.

In 2020, Social Cues won the band's second Grammy Award for Best Rock Album at the 62nd Annual Grammy Awards. The band contributed a cover of the Metallica song "The Unforgiven" to the charity tribute album The Metallica Blacklist, released in September 2021.

On January 5, 2023, lead singer Matt Shultz was arrested in New York on charges of felony firearm possession. Shultz was staying at The Bowery Hotel in Manhattan, where a hotel employee reportedly saw him carrying a firearm into the bathroom and called 9-1-1.

MembersCurrent members Matt Shultz – lead vocals 
 Brad Shultz – rhythm guitar, keyboards , lead guitar 
 Daniel Tichenor – bass, backing vocals 
 Jared Champion – drums, percussion 
 Nick Bockrath – lead guitar, keyboards, backing vocals 
 Matthan Minster – keyboards, rhythm guitar, backing vocals Former members Lincoln Parish – lead guitar, keyboards 

Timeline

DiscographyStudio albums'''
 Cage the Elephant (2008)
 Thank You, Happy Birthday (2011)
 Melophobia (2013)
 Tell Me I'm Pretty (2015)
 Social Cues'' (2019)

References

Further reading

External links

Cage the Elephant artist page on VH1.com
 Interview in the Virgin Red Room

2006 establishments in Kentucky
Alternative rock groups from Kentucky
American blues rock musical groups
American expatriates in England
American garage rock groups
American psychedelic rock music groups
Indie rock musical groups from Kentucky
Jive Records artists
Musical groups established in 2006
Musicians from Bowling Green, Kentucky
Punk blues musical groups
Rock music groups from Kentucky
Relentless Records artists
RCA Records artists
Grammy Award winners
Sibling musical groups